Turnpike Troubadours is an American country music band from Tahlequah, Oklahoma founded in 2005. They started their own imprint, Bossier City Records, in 2007 and have released five studio albums. Their self-titled 2015 album peaked at number 17 on the Billboard 200.

Career
The band was formed in 2005, with original members including Evan Felker and R.C. Edwards. Their debut album Bossier City was recorded a month after the formation of the band, in order to have a recording to sell at live shows. Felker later said the musical arrangements were "not a good representation" of what the band later became. Diamonds & Gasoline followed in 2010.

The songs "Easton and Main" and "Bossier City" were re-recorded for their 2015 self-titled album. Turnpike Troubadours' most recent album, A Long Way from Your Heart, was released in October 2017 and peaked at number three on the Billboard Top Country Albums chart.

In 2019, the band announced they were going on indefinite hiatus. In November 2021, the band's Instagram was cleaned of all previous posts and their website, www.turnpiketroubadours.com, read simply "Coming Soon" with the band's logo.

Later in November 2021, the band announced its reunion and return to touring, with a show at Red Rocks Amphitheatre announced for May 2022.

Discography

Studio albums

Music videos

References

External links
Official website

2007 establishments in Oklahoma
American country music groups
Country music groups from Oklahoma
Musical groups established in 2007
Thirty Tigers artists